A permit room in India is a section of a restaurant where it is permitted to serve alcoholic drinks.

Indian cuisine